Giovanni Battista Eliano (1530–1589) was a Jesuit priest and scholar of Oriental languages.

Life 

Giovanni Battista Eliano, sometimes called Giovanni Battista Romano, was a convert to Roman Catholicism from Judaism, and flourished in the second half of the 16th century. Sources variously say that he was a native of Alexandria, was born in Rome in 1530, or was born in Naples in about 1536.

His maternal grandfather was the noted scholar Elias Levita, whence he adopted the surname Eliano. He was formerly known as Solomon Romano. He received instruction from his learned grandfather while in Germany. He then travelled in Italy, and in Venice he tried to bring his brother back into the fold of the synagogue, in which he did not succeed; on the contrary, he became himself a convert to Christianity, and was baptised in 1551. For a long time he was professor of Hebrew and Arabic in Rome. 

In 1561 Pope Pius IV sent him to the Patriarch of the Copts, together with Roderich, a member of his Order. He translated Giovanni Bruno's catechism, which was written against the Oriental heretics, into three Shemitic languages, and translated into Arabic the Latin decrees of the Council of Trent, for the sake of having them circulated in the East. 

He died at Rome on 3 March 1589.

References

Sources 

 Casari, Mario (2016). "Raimondi, Giovanni Battista". In Dizionario Biografico degli Italiani. Vol. 86. Rome: Istituto dell'Enciclopedia Italiana. Retrieved 5 November 2022.
 Clines, Robert (2019). A Jewish Jesuit in the Eastern Mediterranean. Cambridge: Cambridge University Press. .
 Roth, Cecil (2007). "Eliano, Giovanni Battista". In Encyclopaedia Judaica. Vol. 6. Thomson Gale. p. 318. Retrieved 5 November 2022 – via Encyclopedia.com.
 Zorattini, Cesare Ioly (1993). "Eliano, Giovanni Battista". In Dizionario Biografico degli Italiani. Vol. 42. Istituto dell'Enciclopedia Italiana. Retrieved 5 November 2022.
 "John Eliano". In Encyclopædia Britannica. Retrieved 5 November 2022.
 

Attribution:

 Pick, B. (1880). "Romano, Giovanni Battista". In McClintock, John; Strong, James (eds.). Cyclopædia of Biblical, Theological and Ecclesiastical Literature. Vol. 9.—Rh–St. New York: Harper & Brothers. p. 101. 

1580 deaths
Converts to Christianity from Judaism
16th-century Jesuits
16th-century scholars